Pla de l'Estany is a comarca (county) in Catalonia, Spain. Its name means "plain of the lake", the lake in question being the Lake of Banyoles. Banyoles is also the name of the capital of the comarca and home to over half of its people. Pla de l'Estany was established as a separate comarca in 1988 on the basis of a referendum; prior to that it had constituted the northwest part of the comarca of Gironès. The comarca borders the comarques of Garrotxa, Alt Empordà, and Gironès.

Pla de l'Estany is largely agricultural, but has also long had industries in textiles, furniture, leather, iron, and copper.

Municipalities

References

External links
 Official comarcal web site (in Catalan)

 
Comarques of the Province of Girona